Saratov Reservoir is an artificial lake in the lower part of the Volga River in Russia formed by the dam of the Saratov Hydroelectric Station situated in the city of Balakovo. Filling of the reservoir started in 1967. The uppermost point of the reservoir is situated in Tolyatti, it stretches through Samara Oblast and Saratov Oblast. The city of Samara and the Samara Bend are situated on the reservoir. The namesake city of Saratov is situated downstream from the dam.

Reservoirs in Russia
Reservoirs in Samara Oblast
Reservoirs in Saratov Oblast
Reservoirs built in the Soviet Union
RSaratov

References